Chesterfield Cricket Club is an English amateur cricket club, based in Chesterfield, Derbyshire and is a member of the Derbyshire County Cricket League.

Ground
Chesterfield's main ground, Queen's Park, includes a pavilion, 3 artificial and 2 grass net facilities. Queen's Park has a proud history of annually hoasting 1st Class recreation matches between 1898 - 1998. On the 26 June 1948, Queen's Park hosted a County Championship match between Derbyshire and Yorkshire with a record 14,000 spectators packed into the ground. Today, Chesterfield Cricket Club's 1st and 2nd XI teams use the Queen's Park pitch, rated by the Derbyshire County Cricket League as a Grade A+ ground, and the club's 3rd XI team use a pitch south of Chesterfield on Deer Park, Wingerworth, rated as a Grade B ground.

History
The origins of Chesterfield Cricket Club go back to the 19th century with the New Recreation Ground on Saltergate listed as their home ground. A 3-day match was recorded at the ground between Chesterfield and the 'All England Eleven' in 1869. By 1894, the club was granted permission to move to Queen's Park and a record shows Chesterfield playing in the Derbyshire Cricket League against Creswell Colliery, on 28 April 1900. After the Second World War, Chesterfield became league champions six times between the year 1947 and 1957. Riding on their success, Chesterfield moved from the Derbyshire League and joined the Bassetlaw & District Cricket League in 1958 before returning to Derbyshire in the Derbyshire Premier League in 1999. The following year, the league became an ECB accredited league, where Chesterfield became League Champions in 2008. In 2011, the club joined the Mansfield and District Cricket League with a Sunday 1st XI team, and became Section (Division) 1 Champions in 2021.

The club have three senior teams that compete on Saturdays in the Derbyshire County Cricket League, a Sunday XI in the Mansfield and District Cricket League and an established junior training section that play competitive cricket in the North Derbyshire Youth Cricket League.

Club Performance
The Derbyshire County Cricket League competition results showing the club's positions in the league (by Division) since 1999.

The Mansfield and District Cricket League Sunday League competition results showing the club's position (by Division) since 2011.

Club Honours

Notable players
Some notable players that have represented club and country included:
 Kim Barnett
 Ian Blackwell
 Mike Hendrick
 Geoff Miller
 William Mycroft
 George Pope
 Ben Slater
 Ross Whiteley

Chesterfield CC on film
 Chesterfield CC Memories recorded by the Derbyshire Cricket Foundation 4/12/2018 #1
 Chesterfield CC Memories recorded by the Derbyshire Cricket Foundation 4/12/2018 #2
 Chesterfield CC Memories recorded by the Derbyshire Cricket Foundation 4/12/2018 #3
 Chesterfield CC Memories recorded by the Derbyshire Cricket Foundation 4/12/2018 #4
 Geoff Miller talks about his formative years in cricket. Recorded by the Derbyshire Cricket Foundation 6/2/2018
 East Midlands Today: Derbyshire take on Nottinghamshire in a county cricket match at Chesterfield 20/9/2007

See also
Club cricket

References

External links
 Friends of Queen's Park, Chesterfield
 History of Chesterfield Cricket Club

English club cricket teams
Cricket in Derbyshire
Club cricket